Curling Night in America is an American television program broadcasting a made-for-television curling tournament called the U.S. Curling Grand Prix. The first season aired originally on Universal Sports, starting on January 22, 2015. It has since run for five additional seasons, from 2016 to 2020, on NBCSN.

Format 
Each season covers a made-for-television tournament, called the U.S. Curling Grand Prix, where the United States and three other countries compete for the American Cup. The Grand Prix tournament is a double round-robin tournament, with each team playing every other team in their division twice. The country with the best overall record at the end of the tournament wins the American Cup. In the first season there were two divisions, men's and women's, with one team from each country in each division. In following seasons mixed doubles was added as a third division, thus three teams from each country for a total of twelve teams across all countries and divisions. Each episode shows one game including a team from the United States, along with highlights and score updates from the other games that occurred at the same time.

Production 
The show is recorded in front of a live audience but broadcast at a later date. Originally the United States Curling Association published the results of the tournament in real-time but changed to keeping them secret until broadcast due to feedback. The first three seasons were filmed at curling clubs in Minnesota. The fourth season was the first to take place out of Minnesota and the first to take place out of a curling club; it was held at Baxter Arena in Omaha, Nebraska. This is the same venue that held the 2017 United States Olympic Curling Trials only a few months later. The fifth season returned to Minnesota, held at Chaska Curling Center. The sixth season was the first to take place out of the Midwest, held at an arena in Raleigh, North Carolina. In the fall of 2019 it was announced the seventh season would be filmed at the Great Park Ice arena in Irvine, California, in August 2020. The arena is also scheduled to serve as the venue for the 2021 United States Mixed Doubles Curling Olympic Trials.

All curlers competing in the televised game have microphones, allowing the audience to listen in on strategy discussions and player reactions to shots.

Series overview

Season 1
The inaugural U.S. Curling Grand Prix, filmed December 4 to 6, 2014 at Fours Seasons Curling Club in Blaine, Minnesota. Was aired on Universal Sports Network and NBCSN. Commentary provided by Jason Knapp, Pete Fenson, and Tracy Wilson. At the end of the tournament China won the inaugural American Cup, finishing first in both the men's and women's divisions.

Teams

Episodes

Season 2
Filmed December 3 to 5, 2015 at Curl Mesabi in Eveleth, Minnesota. Commentary provided by Jason Knapp, Pete Fenson, and Tanith White. At the end of the tournament China and the United States were tied for first in the overall standings with eleven points each, with Scotland finishing third and Japan fourth. A draw to the button tiebreaker was conducted to determine the overall winner, with the men's skips from China and the United States, Zang Jialiang and John Shuster, each throwing one stone. Zang won the tiebreaker, earning the American Cup for Team China for the second consecutive year. In the individual discipline standings Scotland won in men's, United States won in mixed doubles, and China won in women's.

Teams

Episodes

Season 3
Filmed December 1 to 3, 2016 at Duluth Curling Club in Duluth, Minnesota. Jason Knapp, Pete Fenson, and Tanith White provided commentary. The United States won the overall tournament, earning the American Cup for the first time.

Teams

Episodes

Season 4
Filmed August 24 to 26, 2017 at Baxter Arena in Omaha, Nebraska; a precursor to the arena holding the Olympic trials. Commentary provided by Jason Knapp, Pete Fenson, and Trenni Kusnierek. The United States won the overall tournament for the second year in a row. In the individual discipline standings Japan won the men's with a draw to the button tiebreaker over the United States, the United States won the women's with a tiebreaker over China, and the United States won in mixed doubles.

Teams

Episodes

Season 5
Filmed August 27 to 29, 2018 at Chaska Curling Center in Chaska, Minnesota. Commentary provided by Jason Knapp, Pete Fenson, and Tanith White. United States represented by three out of five men's Olympic team members, four out of five women's Olympic team members, and the Olympic mixed doubles team of the Hamilton siblings. The United States won the American Cup for a third year in a row, only losing one game across the overall tournament.

Teams

Episodes

Season 6
Filmed August 22 to 24, 2019 at Polar Iceplex in Raleigh, North Carolina. Commentary provided by Jason Knapp, Pete Fenson, and Tanith White. The United States won their fourth American Cup in a row, with Italy finishing second overall, Japan third, and Scotland fourth.

Teams

Episodes

Season 7
To be filmed August 25 to 27, 2021 at the Great Park Ice Arena in Irvine, California.

Teams

References

NBCSN shows
2015 American television series debuts
International curling competitions hosted by the United States